Lionel William John Tollemache, 8th Earl of Dysart (18 November 1794 – 23 September 1878), known as Lionel Manners until 1821, as Lionel Tollemache between 1821 and 1833, and styled Lord Huntingtower between 1833 and 1840, was a British peer and Tory politician.

Background
Dysart was the son of William Manners (later William Tollemache, Lord Huntingtower) and poet Catherine Rebecca Gray, daughter of Francis Gray. In 1821, when his grandmother Louisa Tollemache became 7th Countess of Dysart, he assumed by Royal licence the surname of Tollemache in lieu of Manners. Upon his father's death in 1833, he succeeded as second Baronet of Hanby Hall and as heir apparent to his grandmother, with the courtesy title of Lord Huntingtower.

Political career
Dysart sat as Member of Parliament for Ilchester, alongside his younger brother the Hon. Felix Tollemache, from 1827 until they were defeated at the 1830 general election. In 1836 he was appointed High Sheriff of Leicestershire. In 1841 he succeeded his grandmother in the earldom of Dysart and to her estate at Ham House in  Surrey. However, as this was a Scottish peerage it did not entitle him to a seat in the House of Lords.

Family
Lord Dysart married Maria Elizabeth, daughter of Sweeny Toone, in 1819. In 1820 she bore one son, William Lionel Felix Tollemache. She died in March 1852. Lord Dysart died on 23 September 1878, aged 83, and was succeeded in the earldom by his grandson, William John Manners Tollemache, 9th Earl of Dysart, his son William, styled 'Lord Huntingtower', having predeceased him.

With Esther Cox, Lord Dysart had a natural son Alfred Cox (born 28 March 1818), who changed his name to Alfred Manners in 1850.

References

External links 

1794 births
1878 deaths
Earls of Dysart
Tory MPs (pre-1834)
Members of the Parliament of the United Kingdom for English constituencies
UK MPs 1826–1830
UK MPs who inherited peerages
High Sheriffs of Leicestershire
Lionel Tollemache, 8th Earl Dysart